The Son of Norma is the eleventh solo studio album by American hip hop recording artist SPM, and his fourth album release since the start of his 45-year incarceration in 2002. This 32-track double disc was recorded from prison and released on September 30, 2014, via Dope House Records. The second CD (tracks from 18 to 32) were chopped and screwed by DJ Rapid Ric.

The album peaked at number 61 on the US Billboard 200 chart.

Track listing

Chart history

References

External links
 SPM – The Son Of Norma at Discogs

2014 albums
South Park Mexican albums
Albums produced by Happy Perez